Cossart is a surname. Notable people with the surname include:

Ernest Cossart (1876–1951), English actor
Gabriel Cossart (1615–1674), French historian
Hugh Cossart Baker Jr. (1846–1931), Canadian businessman
Hugh Cossart Baker Sr. (1818–1859), Canadian banker
Linda de Cossart, English surgeon
Pascale Cossart (born 1948), French bacteriologist